Quiet Nights is the tenth studio album by Canadian singer Diana Krall, released on March 31, 2009, by Verve Records.

Background
The album marks Krall's first work with arranger Claus Ogerman since 2002's Live in Paris, and her first studio work with Ogerman since 2001's The Look of Love. In 2010, the title track earned Claus Ogerman the Grammy Award for Best Instrumental Arrangement Accompanying Vocalist(s).

The album's title comes from the English-language title of the bossa nova standard "Corcovado", written by Antonio Carlos Jobim and first made popular in the early 1960s. The title track is one of three selections written or co-written by Jobim. Krall had previously included the Jobim-penned "How Insensitive" ("Insensatez") on her 2006 release From This Moment On, and performed Jobim's "The Girl from Ipanema" (retitled "The Boy from Ipanema") with Rosemary Clooney on the latter's 2000 album Brazil.

Critical reception

Quiet Nights received generally positive reviews from music critics. At Metacritic, which assigns a normalized rating out of 100 to reviews from mainstream publications, the album received an average score of 74, based on 12 reviews.

Jon Caramanica of The New York Times wrote, "The sound and style are the same as for The Look of Love, with Claus Ogerman's billowing strings and woodwinds conjuring a romantic atmosphere with film-noir overtones. Ms. Krall's supple keyboard solos trickle in and out of the orchestration like pianistic pillow talk. She has lowered her voice to a husky near-murmur, as though she were luxuriating in the afterglow of passion on tangled sheets. The forerunners for this excursion into soft-focus eroticism are the ballad albums of Peggy Lee and Julie London".

Steve Greelee of The Boston Globe noted, "The line between dreamy and sleepy is a fine one, and many jazz singers have fallen on the wrong side of it when attempting bossa nova. Diana Krall, however, negotiates it skillfully on Quiet Nights, her first album of all bossas. It probably has a lot to do with her honeyed voice, her laid-back delivery, and her experience – she has 11 albums and 15 years of recording under her belt".

Commercial performance
Quiet Nights debuted at number three on the Canadian Albums Chart, selling 24,000 copies in its first week. Five weeks later, the album peaked at number two with 11,000 units sold. In the United States, it sold 104,000 copies to debut at number three on the Billboard 200 and at number one on the Top Jazz Albums, becoming Krall's ninth number-one album on the latter chart.

In mainland Europe, the album reached the top spot in Hungary, Poland, and Portugal, and charted inside the top five in Austria, France, Greece, Norway, and Spain, as well as on the European Top 100 Albums chart. It also debuted on the New Zealand RIANZ chart at number two. In late 2009, Billboard ranked Quiet Nights at number 25 on the Top Jazz Albums decade-end chart of the 2000s.

Track listing

Notes
 Tracks 1–7 on the deluxe edition bonus DVD were recorded live at ORCAM's auditorium in Madrid, Spain, on May 29, 2009; track 8 is taken from Spectacle: Elvis Costello with...

Personnel
Credits adapted from the liner notes of Quiet Nights.

Musicians
 Diana Krall – vocals, piano
 Anthony Wilson – guitar 
 John Clayton – bass 
 Jeff Hamilton – drums 
 Paulinho da Costa – percussion 
 Claus Ogerman – arrangement, conducting

Orchestra

 Eun Mee Ahn, Charlie Bisharat, Caroline Campbell, Darius Campo, Mario de Leon, Yue Deng, Bruce Dukov (concertmaster), David Ewart, Alan Grunfeld, Tammy Hatwan, Peter Kent, Razdan Kuyumjian, Liane Mautner, Helen Nightengale, Sid Page (concertmaster), Joel Pargman, Katia Popov, Barbara Porter, Gil Romero, Tereza Stanislav, Mari Tsumura, Josephina Vergara, Amy Wickman, Tiffany Yi Hu – violins
 Thomas Dienner, Marlo Fisher, Matt Funes, Janet Lakatos, Vicki Miskolczy, Dan Neufeld, Kate Reddish, Todd Marda, David Walther, Evan Wilson – violas
 Larry Corbett (first), Antony Cooke, Vanessa Freebairn-Smith, Trevor Handy, Timothy Landauer, Steve Richards, Dan Smith, Rudy Stein, Cecilia Tsan – celli
 Nico Carmine Abondolo, Drew Dembowski, Reggie Hamilton, Ed Meares (first), Sue Ranney – basses
 Heather Clark, Steve Kujala, Geri Rotella, David Shostac – alto flutes, bass flutes
 Bill Lane, Joseph Meyer, Todd Miller, Rick Todd (first), Brad Warnaar – French horns
 Earl Dumler – oboe
 Doug Tornquist – tuba
 Robert Zimmitti – vibes

Technical

 Tommy LiPuma – production
 Diana Krall – production
 Al Schmitt – recording, mixing
 Steve Genewick – recording
 Rick Fernandez – engineering assistance
 Dan Johnson – engineering assistance
 Doug Sax – mastering
 Sangwook Nam – mastering

Artwork
 Hollis King – art direction
 Philip Manning – design
 Robert Maxwell – photography
 Daniel Behr – beach photo

Charts

Weekly charts

Year-end charts

Decade-end charts

Certifications

References

2009 albums
Albums arranged by Claus Ogerman
Albums produced by Diana Krall
Albums produced by Tommy LiPuma
Albums recorded at Capitol Studios
Covers albums
Diana Krall albums
Verve Records albums